Zhenping Road is the name of an interchange station on the Shanghai Metro. It serves Lines 3, 4 and 7. The station typically handles 108,000 passengers on weekdays.

Station Layout

References

Railway stations in Shanghai
Shanghai Metro stations in Putuo District
Line 3, Shanghai Metro
Line 4, Shanghai Metro
Line 7, Shanghai Metro
Railway stations in China opened in 2000